Edward Frascino is an American illustrator and author. He is perhaps best known for his illustrations in E.B. White's The Trumpet of the Swan.

Biography 
Frascino is the son of Mario and Rose Frascino. He is of Albanian and Italian descent. 

He attended Parson's School of Design. He served in the U.S. Army in Korea from 1951 to 1953. 

His cartoons have appeared in The New Yorker in a regular series as well as in Punch, Saturday Review, and The New York Times.

Selected works

As author and illustrator

As author

As illustrator

As contributor

Other

References

Further reading 

American writers
American illustrators
American cartoonists
The New Yorker cartoonists
Living people
Year of birth missing (living people)